Dibutoxy ethyl phthalate is an organic compound and phthalate ester, baring 2-butoxyethanol groups. It is used as a plasticizer in polyvinyl chloride, polyvinyl acetate and cellulose acetate. Like most phthalates it is non-volatile, and remains liquid over a wide range of temperatures. Although its water solubility is low, it remains one of the most water soluble of the common phthalates.

References

Phthalate esters
Ethers